Events from the year 1953 in Michigan.

Top stories
The Associated Press polled editors of its member newspapers in Michigan and ranked the state's top news stories of 1953 as follows:
 The June 8 Flint–Beecher tornado resulting in 116 fatalities and tornadoes in Port Huron, and Monroe areas (385 points)
 The $40-million August 12 fire that destroyed General Motors' transmission plant in Livonia (290 points)
 Return of Michigan POWs from Korean War (225 points)
 The November 30 deaths of former Governor Kim Sigler and three others in the crash of a Beechcraft Bonanza airplane, piloted by Sigler, that hit a 540-foot TV tower near Battle Creek (217 points)
 1953 Michigan State Spartans football team wins Big Ten championship and invitation to play in 1953 Rose Bowl (153 points)
 The May 11 sinking of the ore carrier SS Henry Steinbrenner in a Lake Superior storm (129 points)
 Passage of a controversial business receipts tax by the Michigan Legislature (125 points)
 Controversy over bingo games sponsored by churches, charities, and veterans group in violation of state law (107 points)
 The May 22 escape of seven inmates from the Marquette Branch Prison (80 points)
 Laying of two pipelines under the Straits of Mackinac (75 points)

Voting on the top stories ended before the 1953 Detroit Lions won the 1953 NFL Championship Game on December 27.

Office holders

State office holders

 Governor of Michigan: G. Mennen Williams (Democrat)
 Lieutenant Governor of Michigan: William C. Vandenberg (Republican)/Clarence A. Reid(Republican)
 Michigan Attorney General: Frank Millard (Republican)
 Michigan Secretary of State: Frederick M. Alger Jr. (Republican)/Owen Cleary (Republican)
 Speaker of the Michigan House of Representatives: Wade Van Valkenburg (Republican)
 Chief Justice, Michigan Supreme Court:

Mayors of major cities

 Mayor of Detroit: Albert Cobo (Republican)
 Mayor of Grand Rapids: Paul G. Goebel
 Mayor of Flint: Donald W. Riegle Sr.
 Mayor of Saginaw: William R. Hart/George H. Fischer
 Mayor of Dearborn: Orville L. Hubbard
 Mayor of Lansing: Ralph Crego
 Mayor of Ann Arbor: William E. Brown Jr.

Federal office holders
 U.S. Senator from Michigan: Homer S. Ferguson (Republican)
 U.S. Senator from Michigan: Charles E. Potter (Republican) 
 House District 1: Thaddeus M. Machrowicz (Democrat)
 House District 2: George Meader (Republican)
 House District 3: Paul W. Shafer (Republican)
 House District 4: Clare Hoffman (Republican)
 House District 5: Gerald Ford (Republican)
 House District 6: Kit Clardy (Republican)
 House District 7: Jesse P. Wolcott (Republican)
 House District 8: Alvin Morell Bentley (Republican)
 House District 9: Ruth Thompson (Republican)
 House District 10: Elford Albin Cederberg (Republican)
 House District 11: Victor A. Knox (Republican)
 House District 12: John B. Bennett (Republican)
 House District 13: George D. O'Brien (Democrat)
 House District 14: Louis C. Rabaut (Democrat)
 House District 15: John Dingell Sr. (Democrat)
 House District 16: John Lesinski Jr. (Democrat)
 House District 17: Charles G. Oakman (Republican)
 House District 18: George Anthony Dondero (Republican)

Population

Sports

Baseball
 1953 Detroit Tigers season – Under manager Fred Hutchinson, the Tigers compiled a 60–94 record and finished in sixth place in the American League. The team's statistical leaders included Ray Boone with a .312 batting average and 22 home runs, Walt Dropo with 96 RBIs, Ned Garver with 11 wins, and Ralph Branca with a 4.15 earned run average.
 1953 Michigan Wolverines baseball team - Under head coach Ray Fisher, the Wolverines compiled a 21–9 record and won the national championship, defeating Texas in the championship game at the 1953 College World Series. First baseman Bill Mogk was the team captain. Other notable players included third baseman Don Eaddy, shortstop Bruce Haynam, and left fielder Paul Lepley.

American football
 1953 Detroit Lions season – Under head coach Buddy Parker, the Lions compiled a 10–2 record, finished in first place in the NFL Western Conference, and defeated the Cleveland Browns in the 1953 NFL Championship Game. The team's statistical leaders included Bobby Layne with 2,088 passing yards, Robert Hoernschemeyer with 482 rushing yards, and Doak Walker with 502 receiving yards and 93 points scored (five touchdowns, 27 extra points, and 12 field goals).
 1953 Michigan State Spartans football team – Under head coach Biggie Munn, the Spartans compiled a 9–1 record and were ranked No. 3 in the final AP Poll. 
 1953 Michigan Wolverines football team – Under head coach Bennie Oosterbaan, the Wolverines finished in a tie for fifth place in the Big Ten Conference with a record of 6–3 and were ranked No. 20 in the final AP Poll.
 1953 Central Michigan Chippewas football team – Under head coach Kenneth "Bill" Kelly, the Chippewas compiled a 7–1–1 record and won the Interstate Intercollegiate Athletic Conference (IIAC) championship. 
 1953 Detroit Titans football team – The Titans compiled a 6–4 record under head coach Dutch Clark and tied for the Missouri Valley Conference championship.
 1953 Michigan State Normal Hurons football team – Under head coach Fred Trosko, the Hurons compiled a 7–1–1 record.
 1953 Western Michigan Broncos football team – Under head coach Jack Petoskey, the Broncos compiled a 1–6–1 record.

Basketball
 1952–53 Michigan Wolverines men's basketball team – Under head coach William Perigo, the Wolverines compiled a 6–16  record. Paul Groffsky was the team's leading scorer with 301 points in 22 games for an average of 13.6 points per game.
 1952–53 Michigan State Spartans men's basketball team – Under head coach Pete Newell, the Spartans compiled a 13–9 record.
 1952–53 Detroit Titans men's basketball team – The Titans compiled a 12–14 record under head coach Bob Calihan.
 1952–53 Western Michigan Broncos men's basketball team – Under head coach Joseph Hoy, the Broncos compiled a 12–9 record.

Ice hockey
 1952–53 Detroit Red Wings season – Under head coach Tommy Ivan, the Red Wings compiled a 36–16–18 record, finished in first place in the National Hockey League, and lost to the Boston Bruins in the semi-final round of the playoffs. Gordie Howe led the team with 49 goals, 46 assists, and 95 points. The team's goaltender was Terry Sawchuk.  
 1952–53 Michigan Wolverines men's ice hockey season – Under head coach Vic Heyliger, the team compiled a 17–7 record and won the 1953 NCAA Division I Men's Ice Hockey Tournament, the Wolverines' third consecutive NCAA hockey championship.
 1952–53 Michigan State Spartans men's ice hockey team – Under head coach Amo Bessone, the Spartans compiled a 5–16–1 record.
 1952–53 Michigan Tech Huskies men's ice hockey team – Under head coach Al Renfrew, Michigan Tech compiled a 6–13 record.

Boat racing
 Port Huron to Mackinac Boat Race – 
 APBA Gold Cup –

Golfing
 Michigan Open – 
 Motor City Open -

Other

Chronology of events

January

February

March

April

May

June

July

August

September

October

November

December

Births 
 March 13 - Sam Viviano, caricature artist and art director, in Detroit
 May 10 - Christopher Paul Curtis, Newbery Medal-winning writer of children's books (Bud, Not Buddy, The Watsons Go to Birmingham – 1963), in Flint, Michigan
 May 21 - Carl Carlton, R&B, soul, and funk singer-songwriter best known for his hits "Everlasting Love" and "She's a Bad Mama Jama (She's Built, She's Stacked)"), in Detroit
 July 3 - Frank Tanana, Major League Baseball pitcher (1973-1993) and AL ERA leader (1973), in Detroit 
 July 21 - John Nelson, Academy Award-winning visual effects artist (Gladiator, Iron Man), in Detroit
 September 29 - Michael Talbot, author of books highlighting parallels between ancient mysticism and quantum mechanics, in Grand Rapids, Michigan
 November 11 - Marshall Crenshaw, musician, singer and songwriter, in Detroit
 November 27 - Curtis Armstrong, actor (Revenge of the Nerds movies, Moonlighting, Risky Business), in Detroit
 December 6 - Tom Hulce, Academy Award-nominated actor (Amadeus), in Detroit

Gallery of 1953 births

Deaths
 March 10 - Alex J. Groesbeck, Governor of Michigan (1921-1927), at age 79 in Detroit
 May 16 - James Baird, American football quarterback and president of George A. Fuller Co., at age 79 in Tucson, Arizona
 November 30 - Kim Sigler, Governor of Michigan (1947-1949), at age 59 in Augusta, Michigan

Gallery of 1953 deaths

See also
 History of Michigan
 History of Detroit

References